Area codes 814 and 582 are telephone area codes in the North American Numbering Plan (NANP) for the northwestern and central portions of the Commonwealth of Pennsylvania. Cities served by the area code include Altoona, Bradford, DuBois, Erie, Meadville, Oil City, Titusville, Johnstown, St. Marys, and Warren as well as the boroughs of State College, Brockway, Clearfield, Huntingdon, Mount Union,  Bedford, Clarion, Punxsutawney, Tyrone, Ebensburg, Coudersport, Ridgway and Brookville. Area code 814 is the original area code assigned to the numbering plan area in 1947 and area code 582 was activated in the service area as an additional code to form an overlay plan with a starting date of October 3, 2020.

History
Area code 814 is one of the original North American area codes established in 1947. Its numbering plan area (NPA) is the largest in the state. It is the only one of Pennsylvania's original four NPAs that still has its original boundaries. The largest cities in the area are Johnstown, Altoona, State College and Erie; otherwise this region is largely rural.

On May 14, 2020, the Pennsylvania Public Utility Commission approved area code 582 for an all-service overlay, in the face of projections that 814 would exhaust in late 2022. From October 3, 2020 to April 3, 2021, a permissive dialing period was in effect, during which both seven- and ten-digit dialing was allowed. Assignment of telephone numbers of area code 582 began May 1, 2021. With this assignment, seven-digit calling in Pennsylvania became extinct.

Split controversy

When numbering pool exhaustion became a threat in the 2000s, the Pennsylvania Public Utility Commission (PUC) approved a numbering plan split in December 2009, that would have assigned area code 582 to most of the northwestern portion of the territory, including Erie by 2012. The proposed new numbering plan area would have served Erie, Crawford, Warren, Venango, Forest, Clarion, Jefferson, Elk, McKean counties and parts of Armstrong, Clearfield, Indiana, and Mercer. The remaining counties would have retained area code 814. Under the plan, most of Clearfield and Indiana counties would have retained 814; most of Armstrong and Mercer counties would continue in area code 724.

After the decision, a grassroots movement circulated an online petition to request the commission to cancel the action in favor of an overlay plan, a change also supported by the telecommunication industry.

By February 27, 2012, the projected exhaustion date for 814 was changed to the second quarter of 2018,
causing the PUC in a 5–0 vote on April 26, 2012 to dismiss the split plan and implementation schedule. Following projections suggested that 814 would be exhausted by 2021.

Service area
Area codes 814 and 582 serve parts of twenty-seven counties in Pennsylvania.
 Armstrong County (northeastern portion only)
 Bedford County
 Blair County
 Cambria County
 Cameron County
 Centre County (majority of area)
 Clarion County (all except portions of west)
 Clearfield County
 Clinton County (small portions)
 Crawford County (all except southwestern portion)
 Elk County
 Erie County
 Fayette County (a small portion may be assigned to 814, but most if not all uses 724)
 Forest County
 Fulton County (western portions)
 Huntingdon County (except Kishacoquillas Valley)
 Indiana County (northern and eastern portions only)
 Jefferson County
 McKean County
 Mercer County (extreme northeastern portion)
 Mifflin County (extreme southwestern corner only)
 Potter County
 Somerset County
 Tioga County (western portions only)
 Venango County (all except southeastern corner)
 Warren County
 Westmoreland County (extreme northeastern corner only)

See also
 List of Pennsylvania area codes
 List of NANP area codes
 North American Numbering Plan

References

External links
 North American Numbering Plan Administration
 Area code to run out of numbers
 814 area code map
 Save814 Public Advocates 

Telecommunications-related introductions in 1947
814
814